Sestroretsk is a municipal town in Kurortny District of the federal city of St. Petersburg, Russia, located on the shores of the Gulf of Finland, the Sestra River and the Sestroretskiy Lake  northwest of St. Petersburg. Population:    30,500 (1975).

Munitions factory
Sestroretsk was founded by Peter the Great in 1714 due to the construction of a munitions factory (today's Sestroretsk Toolmaking Factory).

Healthcare
The town is known as a balneologic and climatic resort. A large hospital and rehabilitation center is situated within the boundaries of the town. It is the City hospital No. 40 of Saint Petersburg.

Political history
In 1812, the town was incorporated into the Grand Duchy of Finland, along with Old Finland. In 1864, the town was transferred to Russia in exchange for a promise of compensation, supposedly in the form of access to the Arctic Ocean at Petsamo.

Transportation

Railway stations
Sestroretsk railway station
Sestroretsk railway station (1871–1924)
Kurort railway station for the sanatorium

Electric railway
In 1875, Fyodor Pirotsky experimented with electrically powered railway cars on the Miller's line railway. The electricity was transferred over a distance of approximately one kilometer. Although the experiment did not last, this was the first use of electricity to power any railway in the world. Another local railway line of historical interest is the Sestroretsk spur line.

Vodoslivnyy canal
The Vodoslivnyy canal runs across the town from east to west and connects the Sestroretskiy Lake with the Gulf of Finland (Baltic Sea).

Sister cities
The following cities are twinned with Sestroretsk:
 Äänekoski, Finland

Gallery

References

External links

Official website of Sestroretsk 

Cities and towns under jurisdiction of Saint Petersburg
Karelian Isthmus
Kurortny District
1714 establishments in Russia
Sankt-Peterburgsky Uyezd